Konstantin Venkov (born 3 June 1925) was a Bulgarian equestrian. He competed at the 1956 Summer Olympics and the 1960 Summer Olympics.

References

External links
 

1925 births
Possibly living people
Bulgarian male equestrians
Olympic equestrians of Bulgaria
Equestrians at the 1956 Summer Olympics
Equestrians at the 1960 Summer Olympics
People from Veliko Tarnovo
Sportspeople from Veliko Tarnovo Province
20th-century Bulgarian people